Knockholt is a village and civil parish in the Sevenoaks District of Kent, England.

The village is mostly a ribbon development, surrounded by fields that are a part of the Green Belt. There is mixed arable farming. It is in a hilly, rural location, on the top of the dip slope of the North Downs, and has views over London.  The village name, originally Nockholt, is one of many villages in England with a derivation from oak trees, most a strong departure from today's spelling of oak such as Aike.

History
The village's name is derived from the Anglo-Saxon āc-holt meaning "oak copse", to which the final -n of the late Old English dative definite article "ðen" ("the") was accreted. The spelling with initial K- is a relatively recent one. Knockholt was included in Orpington Urban District in 1934.  When Greater London was created in 1965, as part of Orpington UD, Knockholt was included in the London Borough of Bromley.  On 1 April 1969, following a concerted campaign by villagers it was removed from the Borough and returned to Kent, being included in Sevenoaks Rural District.

The area of the parish is virtually unchanged since first drawn in the late medieval period.

The Ivy Farm Communications Centre at Knockholt Pound was the Radio Intercept Station for the non-Morse radio traffic, known as Fish, decoded by Bletchley Park during World War II. The importance of the station is noted in Paul Gannon's book.

There are two parts to the village, Knockholt, near the church and school and The Pound, near the Three Horseshoes pub, The Harrow pub, the village shop and garage.

St Katharine's Church, a Grade II*-listed building, is the Anglican parish church.  Near Knockholt Pound is the London Road Evangelical Church, built in the late 19th century as a Methodist chapel.  Its registration on behalf of the denomination was cancelled in July 1967, and in August 1968 it was re-registered for Evangelical use.  Opposite the parish church is St Katharine's Church of England Primary School.

Transport

Rail

Buses
Knockholt is serves by London Buses routes R5 and R10 which provide connections to Orpington, Cudham and Halstead.

Local activities
Knockholt residents host a village carnival every two years, the most recent being in July 2018, and a fireworks night every year, late October to early November. Funds raised through these and other events go to national and local charities.  A new regular event in the village is the Knockstock music festival, starting in July 2013 and with plans to run in alternating years when the carnival is not operating.

Knockholt Amateur Theatrical Society produce one play and pantomime every year. This charitable society was formed in 1945. Kytens is the local youth amateur theatrical group linked to KATS above. There are many other groups including Bowls, Cricket, Tennis, Horse Riding, Horticulture, Christian Fellowship. This is a popular area for horse riders, walkers, ramblers and cyclists, due to its beauty.

Knockholt Cricket Club completed the 2009 season unbeaten in the Kent County Village League (KCVL) Division 3, which was believed to be a KCVL first.

See also
List of places of worship in Sevenoaks (district)

References

External links

 St Katharine's Church
 Knockholt Parish
 360° Panorama of Knockholt Pound
 Knockholt Carnival website

Villages in Kent
Civil parishes in Kent